Moulton School & Science College is a secondary school with academy status located in the village of Moulton, Northamptonshire. Formerly known as Moulton School, the founding headmaster was Leslie Alfred Scott (1914-1999), who was headmaster from 1954 until his retirement in 1979. He established the school motto - "Fill the Unforgiving Minute". He also established the first house system (Hilary, Bannister, Fleming and Whittle) and created the school crest. Two new houses were added, Scott and Petit, after Scott retired in 1979. As of 2019, the school as of 2019 had 1,355 students on roll, including in the sixth form, and 135 teachers. It is a school for ages 11–18. The school was granted specialist Science College status in 2002, and this was re-designated in 2007.

The acting headteacher, as of March 2021, is Angie Dabbs. The school used to separate the students into four different houses named after the Northamptonshire houses of Holdenby House, Althorp, Rockingham, and Sulgrave Manor. They had different colour ties to represent them: blue for Althorp, green for Holdenby, red for Rockingham and yellow for Sulgrave, but since the 2012–13 academic year, the school has year groups consisting of eight classes per year, instead of houses. The colours for each year are rotated. As of 2022, The year colours are as follows. Gold (Year 7) , Blue (Year 8) , Green (Year 9) , Black (Year 10) Silver (Year 11). They rotate every year.

As of 2022, The houses have been renamed to Hunsbury (Green), Ravensthorpe (Red), Stanwick (Yellow) and Barnwell (Blue). 

The school serves students from Moulton, Pitsford, Boughton, Brixworth, Chapel Brampton, Church Brampton, Old, Kingsthorpe, Walgrave, Harlestone, Rectory Farm, Holcot and Sywell. 

In June 2013, it received a "Good" report from Ofsted. which was confirmed in 2017.

Feeder Schools
Boughton Primary School
Brixworth Primary School
Harlestone Primary School
Moulton Primary School
Overstone Primary School
Pitsford Primary School
Sywell C Of E Primary School
The Bramptons Primary School
Walgrave Primary School

References

External links 
 School profile on Ofsted

Secondary schools in West Northamptonshire District
Academies in West Northamptonshire District
Educational institutions established in 1954
1954 establishments in England